This is a list of countries by electricity exports  mostly based on The World Factbook.

References 

Lists of countries
Energy-related lists by country
Exports by country
electricity exports